Marilyn J. Smith is an American aerospace engineer.

Smith earned her bachelor's, master's and doctoral degrees in aerospace engineering at Georgia Tech. Her studies were funded by Lockheed Martin. She also worked for McDonnell Douglas. Smith later joined the Georgia Tech faculty as professor and director of the Vertical Lift Research Center of Excellence. In 2016, she was elected a fellow of the American Institute of Aeronautics and Astronautics. Smith was the 2022 recipient of the AIAA Aerodynamics Award.

References

20th-century women engineers
21st-century women engineers
Women aerospace engineers
Living people
Fellows of the American Institute of Aeronautics and Astronautics
Year of birth missing (living people)
McDonnell Douglas
Georgia Tech faculty
Georgia Tech alumni
20th-century American engineers
21st-century American engineers
American women engineers
American aerospace engineers
Lockheed Martin people
Engineers from Georgia (U.S. state)